Ophiclinops pardalis, the Spotted snakeblenny, is a species of clinids native to the coastal waters of southern Australia in seagrass beds.  It can reach a maximum length of  TL.

References

pardalis
Fish described in 1918
Taxa named by Allan Riverstone McCulloch
Taxa named by Edgar Ravenswood Waite